General elections were held in Japan on 20 February 1930. The Constitutional Democratic Party, which was led by Prime Minister Hamaguchi Osachi, won an overall majority in the House of Representatives. Voter turnout was 82%.

Results

By prefecture

References

General elections in Japan
Japan
1930 elections in Japan
Politics of the Empire of Japan
February 1930 events
Election and referendum articles with incomplete results